Khangal is a sum (district) of Bulgan Province in northern Mongolia. In 2009, its population was 4,700.

Notable people
Anandyn Amar (1886-1941) - Head of State

References

Districts of Bulgan Province